CADMOS is a submarine telecommunications cable system in the Mediterranean Sea linking Cyprus and the Lebanon.

It has landing points in:
 Pentaskhinos, Cyprus
 Beirut, Lebanon

It has a design transmission capacity of 622 Mbit/s and a total cable length of 230 km.  It started operation on 8 September 1995.

References
 

Submarine communications cables in the Mediterranean Sea
1995 establishments in Cyprus
1995 establishments in Lebanon